George Cochrane Hazelton (1868–1921) was an American actor and playwright.

Hazelton was born January 20, 1868. He performed as an actor with Lawrence Barrett, Edwin Booth, and Helena Modjeska. His first attempt as a playwright was The Raven: The Love Story of Edgar Allan Poe, which was later made into a film. His next play, Mistress Nell, was written in 1900 and was a great success. His most well-known play was The Yellow Jacket, which he co-authored in 1912 with Joseph Henry McAlpin Benrimo. The Yellow Jacket was performed around the world by a number of notable actors including Mr. and Mrs. Charles Coburn and Harpo Marx. Hazelton died in New York on June 24, 1921.

References

External links

 
 
 
 https://www.ibdb.com/broadway-cast-staff/george-c-hazelton-5791
 George Cochrane Hazelton papers, 1848-1921, held by the Billy Rose Theatre Division, New York Public Library for the Performing Arts
 George Cochrane Hazelton papers archives.nypl.org
 George Cochrane Hazelton scores, held by the Music Division, New York Public Library for the Performing Arts

1868 births
1921 deaths
19th-century American male actors
American male stage actors
American dramatists and playwrights